Allocnemidinae is a subfamily of damselflies in the family Platycnemididae. There are 5 genera in Allocnemidinae, found in Africa and Arabia.

The subfamily Allocnemidinae was defined by Dijkstra, et al., in 2014, as a result of a comprehensive phylogenetic study of the damselfly families.

Genera
These five genera belong to the subfamily Allocnemidinae:
 Allocnemis Selys, 1863
 Arabicnemis Waterston, 1984
 Mesocnemis Karsch, 1891
 Metacnemis Hagen, 1863
 Stenocnemis Karsch, 1899

References

Platycnemididae